Unyamwezi is a historical region in what is now Tanzania, around the modern city of Tabora to the south of Lake Victoria and east of Lake Tanganyika.
It lay on the trade route from the coast to Lake Tanganyika and to the kingdoms to the west of Lake Victoria.
The various peoples of the region were known as long-distance traders, providing porters for caravans and arranging caravans in their own right.
At first the main trade was in ivory, but later slaving became more important.

Location

The Unyamwezi region lies around the modern town of Tabora, between the coast and Lake Tanganyika, and includes the Tabora, Nzega and Kahama districts of the western plateau of modern Tanzania.
Unyamwezi is mentioned as early as the 16th century by the Portuguese and by Antonio Pigafetta, under the name Munemugi or " Land of the Moon," which is the exact equivalent of the name Wu-nya-mweziby which the land is known to its own people. The Encyclopædia Britannica Eleventh Edition said the region "is rich in woods and grass, and has many villages surrounded by well cultivated farms and gardens. The western portions, however, are somewhat swampy and unhealthy."

In the 19th century the inhabitants were called Nyamwezi people by outsiders, although this term covered various different groups.

History
Unyamwezi lay at a juncture where a trade route from the coast split, with one branch going west to the port of Ujiji on Lake Tanganyika while another branch led north to the kingdoms of Buganda and Bunyoro.
Coastal traders settled in Unyamwezi, some with hundreds of well-armed retainers.
The Nyamwezi provided most of the porters for the caravans organized by the coastal Arabs and Swahilis,
and also conducted their own caravans.
The Nyamwezi  were long-distance traders throughout East Africa.

Ivory was not widely used by the Nyamwezi, but at some point they became aware that there was an overseas market for the product, and began to carry ivory along the route from Tabora down to the Indian Ocean coast opposite Zanzibar. There are records of Sultan Sayyid Said of Zanzibar negotiating with envoys from Unyamwezi in 1839 for safe passage for caravans to the interior.
The Nyamwezi did not sell their own people as slaves, since they needed manpower for the ivory trade, but after the 1850s the slave trade began to become important. Slaves brought from the Congo Basin or the Great Lakes region would be held at Tabora, then sent down to the coast in small groups for onward shipment.

The first Europeans to reach the region were Richard Francis Burton and John Hanning Speke, who had been sponsored by the Royal Geographical Society and the British government to investigate the great Lake Uniamési said by German missionaries to lie in the region and determine if it was the source of the Nile.
Burton and Speke reached Zanzibar on 20 December 1857,
visited Johannes Rebmann (who had reported the lake) at his Kisuludini mission station, and paid a visit to Fuga, capital of the Usambare kingdom.
They left for the interior on 26 June 1858. After travelling through mountainous country they reached the inner plateau of Uniamesi.

At Kazeh Burton and Speke found a mixed population of Nyamwezi, Tutsi and Arabs engaged in cattle farming and cultivation of foods such as rice, cassava, pawpaw and citrus.
Burton called Unyamwezi the garden of inter-tropical Africa.
Henry Morton Stanley visited the region in 1871, where he found that the Zanzibar Arabs were predominant in the country.
According to the Encyclopædia Britannica Eleventh Edition, "later the natives rose and, under Mirambo—who had been a common porter and rose to be a conquering chief, earning for himself the title of the Black Bonaparte—a Negro kingdom was formed. Since 1890 the country has been under German control and the power of the native chiefs greatly curtailed."

Notes

References

Geography of Tanzania
Historical regions